Rakesh Verma (died May 20, 2020) was an Indian politician and member of the Bharatiya Janata Party. Verma was a member of the Himachal Pradesh Legislative Assembly from the Theog constituency in Shimla district.

References 

People from Shimla district
Bharatiya Janata Party politicians from Himachal Pradesh
2020 deaths
21st-century Indian politicians
Year of birth missing
Himachal Pradesh MLAs 1993–1998
Himachal Pradesh MLAs 2003–2007
Himachal Pradesh MLAs 2007–2012